Samreboi is a town in the Western Region of Ghana.It is approximately 6 hours drive from Kumasi in the Ashanti region.

References

Populated places in the Western Region (Ghana)